The MF Mate Balota is a ferry for local lines, part of the fleet of the Croatian shipping company Jadrolinija. It was built in 1988 at the Kraljevica Shipyard. It once sailed on the line Valbiska - Merag. Today MF Mate Balota mostly sails on the lines around Zadar. In January 2018 it started sailing as a replacement on the line Dubrovnik - Suđurađ. In July 2018 it sailed on the line Zadar - Preko. It was named after Mate Balota.

Its capacity is 440 passengers and 50 cars.

References

Ferries of Croatia
1988 ships
Ships built in Croatia